The Magic City is an album by the American jazz musician Sun Ra and his Solar Arkestra. Recorded in two sessions in 1965, the record was released on Ra's own Saturn label in 1966. The record was reissued by Impulse! in 1973, and on compact disc by Evidence in 1993.

Birmingham, Alabama
The title Magic City refers to Ra's home town of Birmingham, Alabama, and to a large metal sign with the words 'Birmingham, The Magic City' erected in front of the railway station, Birmingham Terminal Station, in 1926 (see .) The cover art, by William White (as noted on the back side), directly references the dome of the station. Ra grew up next to the post office and close to the main station, where, "as a child, Sonny could look out the window and see the big sign over the railroad tracks that greeted visitors to The Magic City". John F. Szwed explains:

Critical reception
The Penguin Guide to Jazz Recordings includes the album in its suggested “Core Collection” of essential recordings.

It is notable especially for the title track, on which "the Arkestra's range of feelings and sound is expressed in a design that's simply unprecedented in jazz." While it begins with use of tape echo recalling the experiments on Art Forms of Dimensions Tomorrow, the key features quickly emerge: Ra's simultaneous piano and clavioline intertwining with Boykins's bass as the underpinning for new long-forms of group music-making which draw on varying sub-ensembles from the Arkestra through the course of the piece. Lindsay Planer writes:

The Spin Alternative Record Guide wrote that the album title's significance "further muddies [Sun Ra's] myth and throws his most far-reaching and cohesive endeavor into poignant relief."

Track listing

12" vinyl
All songs written by Sun Ra.
Side A:
 "The Magic City" – (27:22)
Side B:
 "The Shadow World" – (10:55)
 "Abstract Eye" – (2:51)
 "Abstract 'I'" – (4:08)

"The Shadow World", "Abstract Eye" and "Abstract 'I'" were recorded live at Olatunji's loft, New York, Spring 1965. "The Magic City" was recorded during rehearsals around 24 September 1965.

Personnel
Sun Ra – piano, clavioline
Pat Patrick – baritone saxophone, flute, tympani
John Gilmore – tenor saxophone
Marshall Allen – alto saxophone, flute, oboe, piccolo
Danny Davis – alto saxophone, flute
Harry Spencer – alto saxophone
Robert Cummings – bass clarinet
Walter Miller – trumpet
Chris Capers – trumpet
Ali Hassan – trombone
Teddy Nance – trombone
Bernard Pettaway – trombone
Roger Blank – Percussion
Ronnie Boykins – bass
Jimhmi Johnson – Percussion

References

1966 albums
Sun Ra albums
Impulse! Records albums
El Saturn Records albums
Evidence Music albums